Antonio Grassi (1644–1715) was a Roman Catholic prelate who served as Bishop of Chioggia (1696–1715).

Biography
Antonio Grassi was born in Chioggia, Italy on 11 July 1644. On 18 December 1666, he was ordained a deacon and on 4 June 1667, he was ordained a priest.
On 21 May 1696, he was appointed during the papacy of Pope Innocent XII as Bishop of Chioggia.
On 3 June 1696, he was consecrated bishop by Bandino Panciatici, Cardinal-Priest of San Pancrazio, with Prospero Bottini, Titular Archbishop of Myra, and Sperello Sperelli, Bishop of Terni, serving as co-consecrators.
He served as Bishop of Chioggia until his death on 4 November 1715.
While bishop, he ordained Gian Alberto De' Grandi to the priesthood.

References

External links and additional sources
 (for Chronology of Bishops) 
 (for Chronology of Bishops) 

17th-century Italian Roman Catholic bishops
18th-century Italian Roman Catholic bishops
Bishops appointed by Pope Innocent XII
1644 births
1715 deaths
People from Chioggia